Wahlenbergia angustifolia, also called small bellflower, is a species of plant in the family Campanulaceae. It is endemic to Saint Helena. Its natural habitat is rocky areas. It is endangered because of habitat loss.

References

angustifolia
Endangered plants
Flora of Saint Helena
Taxonomy articles created by Polbot